The 1961–62 NBA season was the Celtics' 16th season in the NBA. The Celtics defeated the Los Angeles Lakers to claim their fifth NBA Championship. They set new records with the most games won and the first NBA team to post 60 wins. Three years later, the Celtics would break this record with 62 wins in 1964–65 season.

Offseason

NBA Draft
The 1961 NBA Draft took place on March 27, 1961.

Roster
.

Regular season

Season standings

Record vs. opponents

Game log

Playoffs

|- align="center" bgcolor="#ccffcc"
| 1
| March 24
| Philadelphia
| W 117–89
| Sam Jones (20)
| Bill Russell (30)
| Bob Cousy (8)
| Boston Garden
| 1–0
|- align="center" bgcolor="#ffcccc"
| 2
| March 27
| @ Philadelphia
| L 106–113
| Tom Heinsohn (24)
| Bill Russell (20)
| Bill Russell (6)
| Philadelphia Civic Center
| 1–1
|- align="center" bgcolor="#ccffcc"
| 3
| March 28
| Philadelphia
| W 129–114
| Russell, Heinsohn (31)
| Bill Russell (31)
| Bob Cousy (10)
| Boston Garden
| 2–1
|- align="center" bgcolor="#ffcccc"
| 4
| March 31
| @ Philadelphia
| L 106–110
| Bill Russell (31)
| Bill Russell (30)
| Bob Cousy (10)
| Philadelphia Civic Center
| 2–2
|- align="center" bgcolor="#ccffcc"
| 5
| April 1
| Philadelphia
| W 119–104
| Bill Russell (29)
| Bill Russell (26)
| Russell, S. Jones (7)
| Boston Garden
| 3–2
|- align="center" bgcolor="#ffcccc"
| 6
| April 3
| @ Philadelphia
| L 99–109
| Heinsohn, Cousy (22)
| Bill Russell (22)
| Bob Cousy (12)
| Philadelphia Civic Center
| 3–3
|- align="center" bgcolor="#ccffcc"
| 7
| April 5
| Philadelphia
| W 109–107
| Sam Jones (28)
| Bill Russell (22)
| K. C. Jones (10)
| Boston Garden
| 4–3
|-

|- align="center" bgcolor="#ccffcc"
| 1
| April 7
| Los Angeles
| W 122–108
| Sam Jones (24)
| Bill Russell (28)
| Bob Cousy (7)
| Boston Garden7,467
| 1–0
|- align="center" bgcolor="#ffcccc"
| 2
| April 8
| Los Angeles
| L 122–129
| Tom Heinsohn (27)
| Bill Russell (23)
| Bob Cousy (11)
| Boston Garden12,364
| 1–1
|- align="center" bgcolor="#ffcccc"
| 3
| April 10
| @ Los Angeles
| L 115–117
| Bill Russell (26)
| Bill Russell (32)
| Bob Cousy (8)
| Los Angeles Memorial Sports Arena15,180
| 1–2
|- align="center" bgcolor="#ccffcc"
| 4
| April 11
| @ Los Angeles
| W 115–103
| Bill Russell (21)
| Bill Russell (22)
| Bob Cousy (13)
| Los Angeles Memorial Sports Arena15,104
| 2–2
|- align="center" bgcolor="#ffcccc"
| 5
| April 14
| Los Angeles
| L 121–126
| Tom Heinsohn (30)
| Bill Russell (29)
| Bob Cousy (10)
| Boston Garden13,909
| 2–3
|- align="center" bgcolor="#ccffcc"
| 6
| April 16
| @ Los Angeles
| W 119–105
| Sam Jones (35)
| Bill Russell (24)
| Bill Russell (10)
| Los Angeles Memorial Sports Arena14,030
| 3–3
|- align="center" bgcolor="#ccffcc"
| 7
| April 18
| Los Angeles
| W 110–107 (OT)
| Bill Russell (30)
| Bill Russell (40)
| Bob Cousy (9)
| Boston Garden13,909
| 4–3
|-

Awards and honors
 Bill Russell, NBA Most Valuable Player
 Bill Russell, All-NBA Second team
 Bob Cousy,  All-NBA Second team
 Tom Heinsohn, All-NBA Second team

References

 Celtics on Database Basketball
  Celtics on Basketball Reference

Boston Celtics seasons
NBA championship seasons
Boston Celtics
Boston Celtics
Boston Celtics
1960s in Boston